Lochum is an Ortsgemeinde – a community belonging to a Verbandsgemeinde – in the Westerwaldkreis in Rhineland-Palatinate, Germany.

Geography

The village is located in the northeast of Koblenz on the Westerwald Lake Plateau. The residential community of Lochum belongs to the Verbandsgemeinde of Hachenburg, a kind of collective municipality. Its administrative center is the homonym town.

History
In 1048, Lochum had its first documentary mention.

Politics

The municipal council is made up of 9 council members, including the extraofficial mayor (Bürgermeister), who were elected in a majority vote in a municipal election on 13 June 2004.

Economy and infrastructure

The community lies between Bundesstraßen 255, linking Koblenz and Hachenburg, and 414, leading from Montabaur to Herborn. Bundesautobahn 3 with its Montabaur interchange (AS 40) lies 25 km away. The nearest InterCityExpress stop is the railway station at Montabaur on the Cologne-Frankfurt high-speed rail line.

References

External links
  Lochum in the collective municipality’s Web pages 

Municipalities in Rhineland-Palatinate
Westerwaldkreis